Geoff Ryman (born 1951) is a writer of science fiction, fantasy,  historical fiction, he was also one of the founding members of the Mundane science fiction movement. In 2008 a Mundane SF issue of Interzone magazine was published, guest edited by Geoff Ryman, Julian Todd and Trent Walters.
Ryman says he knew he was a writer "before [he] could talk", with his first work published in his Mother's newspaper column at six years of age.
He is most well known for his science fiction writing, however his first novel was the fantasy The Warrior Who Carried Life, and his revisionist fantasy Was has been called "his most accomplished work".

Much of his work is based on travels to Cambodia.  The first of these The Unconquered Country (1986) was winner of the World Fantasy Award and British Science Fiction Association Award.   His novel The King's Last Song (2006) was set both in the Angkor Wat era and the time after Pol Pot and the Khmer Rouge.

He was guest of honour at Novacon in 1989 and has twice been a guest speaker at Microcon, in 1994 and in 2004. He was also the guest of honour at Gaylaxicon 2008.

Ryman has written and published seven novels, including an early example of a hypertext novel, 253, or Tube Theatre. He is currently at work on a new historical novel set in the United States before the Civil War. His novels and novelas have won multiple awards, including the World Fantasy Award, and his novel Was was inducted into the Gaylactic Spectrum Hall of Fame. His novel 'Air was nominated for eight awards, winning four. In total, Ryman's works have been nominated for 59 speculative fiction awards.

Arthur C. Clarke Awards
The Arthur C. Clarke Award is a British award given for the best science fiction novel first published in the United Kingdom during the previous year.  The award was established with a grant from Arthur C. Clarke and the first prize was awarded in 1987.  The book is chosen by a panel of judges from the British Science Fiction Association, the Science Fiction Foundation and a third organization, currently SF Crowsnest. It is now administered by the Serendip Foundation. The winner receives a prize consisting of a number of pounds sterling equal to the current year (£2008 for year 2008). In recent years, the award has been presented on the opening night of the SCI-FI-LONDON film festival.

|-
| 1990 || The Child Garden|| Arthur C. Clarke Award || 
|-
| 2005|| Air, or Have not Have || Arthur C. Clarke Award ||

British Science Fiction Association Awards
The British Science Fiction Association (BSFA) annually presents four awards (though numbers have differed in previous years) based on a vote of BSFA members and recently also members of the Eastercon. Ryman's works have been nominated ten times in the novel and short fiction categories, and won three times.

|-
| 1984 || "The Unconquered Country"|| British Science Fiction Association Award for best short fiction|| 
|-
| 1986 || "O Happy Day!"|| British Science Fiction Association Award for best short fiction|| 
|-
| 1986 || The Warrior Who Carried Life|| British Science Fiction Association Award for best novel|| 
|-
| 1988 || "Love Sickness"|| British Science Fiction Association Award for best short fiction|| 
|-
| 1990 || The Child Garden|| British Science Fiction Association Award for best novel || 
|-
| 1995|| "Warmth"|| British Science Fiction Association Award for best short fiction|| 
|-
| 2002|| "Lust"|| British Science Fiction Association Award for best novel|| 
|-
| 2004|| "Birth Days"|| British Science Fiction Association Award for best short fiction|| 
|-
| 2006|| Air, or Have not Have ||British Science Fiction Association Award for best novel|| 
|-
| 2016|| 100 African Writers of SFF ||British Science Fiction Association Award for best non-fiction||

John W. Campbell Memorial Award

|-
| 1988 || The Unconquered Country|| John W. Campbell Memorial Award for best SF novel|| 
|-
| 1990 || The Child Garden|| John W. Campbell Memorial Award for best SF novel || 
|-
| 2005|| Air, or Have not Have || John W. Campbell Memorial Award for best SF novel||

Gaylactic Spectrum Awards

|-
| 2002 || Was|| Gaylactic Spectrum Hall of Fame|| 
|-
| 2004|| Lust || Gaylactic Spectrum Award for best novel||

Interzone Poll

|-
| 1985 || The Unconquered Country|| Interzone Poll for best fiction|| 
|-
| 1995 || "Fan"|| Interzone Poll for best fiction|| 
|-
| 1995 || "Dead Space for the Unexpected"|| Interzone Poll for best fiction|| 
|-
| 1996 || "Warmth"|| Interzone Poll for best fiction||

James Tiptree, Jr. Award

|-
| 1995|| Unconquered Countries|| Tiptree award for best fiction|| || —
|-
| 2004|| "Birth Days"|| Tiptree award for best fiction|| || —
|-
| 2006|| "Air"|| Tiptree award for best fiction|| || —
|-
| 2006|| Tesseracts Nine|| Tiptree award for best fiction|| || Co-edited with Nalo Hopkinson

Locus Awards

|-
| 1985|| "The Unconquered Country"||Locus Award for Best Novella|| || —
|-
| 1986|| O Happy Day!||Locus Award for Best Novelette|| || —
|-
| 1986|| The Warrior Who Carried Life||Locus Award for best first novel|| || —
|-
| 1987|| The Unconquered Country||Locus Award for best novel|| || —
|-
| 1988|| "Love Sickness"||Locus Award for Best Novella|| || —
|-
| 1990|| The Child Garden||Locus Award for best science fiction novel|| || —
|-
| 1993|| Was || Locus Award for Best Fantasy Novel|| || —
|-
| 1994|| "A Fall of Angels, or On the Possibility of Life Under Extreme Conditions"||Locus Award for Best Novella|| || —
|-
| 1994|| "Fan"||Locus Award for Best Novella|| || —
|-
| 1995|| Unconquered Countries|| Locus Awards for best collection|| || —
|-
| 1995|| "Home"|| Locus Awards for best short story|| || —
|-
| 1999|| "Everywhere"|| Locus Awards for best short story|| || —
|-
| 2002|| "Have Not Have"|| Locus Awards for best short story|| || —
|-
| 2003|| "V.A.O."|| Locus Awards for best novelette|| || —
|-
| 2004|| "Birth Days"|| Locus Awards for best short story|| || —
|-
| 2005|| Air|| Locus Award for best science fiction novel|| || —
|-
| 2006|| "The Last Ten Years in the Life of Hero Kai"|| Locus Award for best science fiction novelette|| || —
|-
| 2006|| Tesseracts Nine|| Locus Awards for best anthology|| || Co-edited with Nalo Hopkinson
|-
| 2007|| "Pol Pot's Beautiful Daughter (Fantasy)" || Locus Award for best science fiction novelette||

Nebula Awards

|-
| 1988|| The Unconquered Country||Nebula Award for best novella|| 
|-
| 1995|| Fan || Nebula Award for best novella|| 
|-
| 2006|| Air, or Have not Have || Nebula Award for best novel|| 
|-
| 2008|| Pol Pot's Beautiful Daughter (Fantasy) || Nebula Award for best novelette||

Philip K. Dick Award

|-
| 1999|| 253||Philip K. Dick Award|| 
|-
| 2005|| Air, or Have not Have || Philip K. Dick Award||

Theodore Sturgeon Awards

|-
| 2000|| "Everywhere"||Theodore Sturgeon Awards|| 
|-
| 2002|| "Have not Have" || Theodore Sturgeon Awards||

World Fantasy Award

|-
| 1985|| The Unconquered Country||World Fantasy Award for best novella|| || —
|-
| 1993|| Was || World Fantasy Award for best novel|| || —
|-
| 2007|| Pol Pot's Beautiful Daughter (Fantasy) || World Fantasy Award for best short fiction|| || —

Other awards

|-
| 1988|| The Warrior Who Carried Life||Crawford Award for best novel|| || Given by International Association for the Fantastic in the Arts to a first fantasy novel published in the preceding 18 months.
|-
| 1998|| "Family"||BSFA Award for best short story|| ||Given by the British Science Fiction Association (BSFA) to a short story published in Britain in the preceding year. Based on a vote of BSFA members and attendees the Eastercon.
|-
| 2004|| Air||Sunburst for best novel|| || —
|-
| 2006|| Tesseracts 9||Prix Aurora Award for best other work in English|| || Co-edited with Nalo Hopkinson
|-
| 2007 || "Pol Pot's Beautiful Daughter (Fantasy)"|| Hugo Award for best novelette|| || —

See also
 Geoff Ryman bibliography

References
General

Specific

External links
 

Science fiction awards
 
Lists of awards received by writer